Mary Ann Handley (born May 13, 1936) is an American politician. Handley, a Democrat, served as a member of the Connecticut State Senate from 1997 until her unexpected retirement in 2010. She was Chief Deputy Majority Leader, as well as a member of the Appropriations, Commerce, Higher Education and Employment Advancement, and Judiciary Committees.

A resident of Manchester, she represented Bolton, Glastonbury, Manchester, and Marlborough in the Connecticut Senate. Prior to being elected to the senate, Handley served as deputy mayor of Manchester (1991–1996) and as a member of the Manchester Board of Directors (1987–1989, 1991–1996). Handley also was a college professor from 1967 to 1997.

She was born and raised in Manchester. Handley holds a Bachelor of Arts from Connecticut College and a Master of Arts from the University of Connecticut.

See also
Connecticut Senate

References

External links
Official website

1936 births
Connecticut College alumni
Democratic Party Connecticut state senators
Living people
Alumni of the University of London
Mayors of places in Connecticut
People from Manchester, Connecticut
University of Connecticut alumni
Wesleyan University alumni
Women state legislators in Connecticut